Chrysoliocola is a genus of scarab beetles.

References

External links 

 
 Chrysoliocola at insectoid.info

Cetoniinae
Scarabaeidae genera